Sihai Town is a town in the Yanqing District of Beijing. It borders Qianjiadian Town and Zhenzhuquan Township in the north, Liulimiao and Yanqi Towns in the east, Bohai and Jiuduhe Towns in the south, as well as Yongning Town and Liubinbao Townships in the west. Its population was 4,434 as of 2020.

This region hosted a major smelter during the Yuan dynasty. With more workers immigrated here from all over China, the region was named Sihai in the sense of "People come here from all four seas/all over the world."

Geography 
Sihai Town sits in a basin within Yan Mountain Range, with the Caishi River flowing through it.

History

Administrative divisions 
As of the year 2021, 19 subdivisions, more specifically 1 community and 18 villages, constituted Sihai Town, They can be seen in the following table:

See also 

 List of township-level divisions of Beijing

References

Yanqing District
Towns in Beijing